Calgary-Beddington is a provincial electoral district in the city of Calgary, Alberta, Canada. The district is one of 87 districts mandated to return a single member (MLA) to the Legislative Assembly of Alberta using the first past the post method of voting. The seat has been held by Josephine Pon of the United Conservative Party since the 2019 Alberta election.

Geography
The district is located in northern Calgary, containing the neighbourhoods of Huntington Hills, Beddington Heights, Sandstone Valley, Country Hills, MacEwan, and Hidden Valley. The riding also includes Nose Hill Park, which lies to the south and west of the residential areas.

History

The Calgary-Beddington electoral district was created in 2017 when the Electoral Boundaries Commission recommended renaming Calgary-Mackay-Nose Hill and changing its shape, removing its northern area but adding neighbourhoods from Calgary-Foothills and Calgary-Northern Hills. The Commission chose the name Beddington for this district because it "would most readily identify its location to residents in Calgary." The boundaries of the new electoral district in 2017 would have a population of 50,220, 7% above the provincial average of 46,803.

In the 2019 Alberta general election, United Conservative Party candidate Josephine Pon would defeat NDP candidate Amanda Chapman by 3,807 votes. Pon gained the nomination for the Calgary-Beddington electoral district after Randy Kerr was removed by the UCP for failure to be "forthcoming" during the Alberta Election Commissioner's investigation into the Jeff Callaway leadership campaign for the UCP. On April 30, 2019, Premier Jason Kenney would appoint Pon to Cabinet as the Minister of Seniors and Housing.

Electoral results

See also
List of Alberta provincial electoral districts

References

External links
Elections Alberta
The Legislative Assembly of Alberta

Alberta provincial electoral districts
Politics of Calgary